Ronald Y. K. Fung (born 1937) was professor of Biblical Studies at China Graduate School of Theology. He is best known for his Galatians contribution to commentary series the New International Commentary on the New Testament.

Biography 
Fung completed a BA from the University of Hong Kong in 1960 and studied at London Bible College from 1962 to 1965, completing a BD from London University in 1966. He later completed his ThM at Fuller Theological Seminary in 1971, before completing a PhD from University of Manchester in 1975, on a thesis supervised by F. F. Bruce entitled "The Relationship Between Righteousness and Faith in the Thought of Paul: as Expressed in the Letters to the Galatians and the Romans."

Recognized as an important name in Hong Kong biblical scholarship, Fung spent most of his career as a Professor of Biblical Studies at China Graduate School of Theology in Hong Kong.

Selected works

Books

Articles & chapters

References

1937 births
Living people
Bible commentators

Fuller Theological Seminary alumni
Alumni of the University of Manchester
New Testament scholars
Hong Kong Protestant theologians